Leonding is a city southwest of Linz in the Austrian state of Upper Austria. It borders Puchenau and the river Danube in the north, Wilhering and Pasching in the west, Traun in the south and Linz in the east. With a population of more than 27 thousand people, Leonding is the most populous city of the Linz-Land district and the fourth most populous city in Upper Austria.

It is very close to Linz and offers views of the Alps and therefore attracts the upper social classes for living without providing much infrastructure on its own. Due to the proximity of Linz and transport connections (like West railway, Westautobahn, B1 Wiener Straße or Linz Airport) it attracts companies like Rosenbauer, Ebner Industrieofenbau, Poloplast or Neuson. Other major employers are the UNO Shopping Center (approximately 850 jobs) as well as the Plus City Shopping Center (approximately 2200 jobs).

From 1898 to 1905 Adolf Hitler lived in Leonding where he attended the local primary school and later a grammar school in nearby Linz. The graves of his parents Alois and Klara are in Leonding. His brother Edmund, who died of measles, was buried there too. A delegation of Passau National Socialists visited the family's grave illegally. Hitler visited the grave in 1938. In 2012, when a relative of Alois Hitler's first wife, Anna, did not renew the lease, the grave was dissolved.

In 1903, Hitler's father died when drinking a glass of wine in a guesthouse in Leonding.

Leonding is split up into 22 localities: Aichberg, Alharting, Berg, Bergham, Buchberg, Doppl, Enzenwinkl, Felling, Friesenegg, Gaumberg, Haag, Hart, Holzheim, Imberg, Jetzing, Leonding, Reith, Rufling, St. Isidor, Staudach, Untergaumberg and Zaubertal.

Population
The Town of Leonding grew rapidly since the year 2000 and the Population in 2018 was 28,698 jumping up from 22,203 in 2001. This rapid growth was mainly due to affordable, decently sized homes that were much cheaper than those in neighboring Linz. Leonding is also a very attractive living area for middle class Families which is another reason for the speedy growth.

Local council

The elections in 2015 showed the following results:

Total: 37 seats

Mayors

See also
 Oberösterreich

References

External links

 Official Homepage

Populated places on the Danube
Cities and towns in Linz-Land District